Bury the Pain is the fifth studio album by British thrash metal band Xentrix, released on 7 June 2019 in Europe and 21 June 2019 in North America, 25 years after their previous album Scourge. A music video was produced for the albums title track, "Bury the Pain". It marks the first album with new guitarist/vocalist Jay Walsh, replacing their previous member Chris Astley. In a post on the band's official Facebook page, they stated that by the end of 2015, Astley had no longer wanted to be a part of Xentrix and had left the band. To promote their return, they released a single for the track "Bleeding Out" on streaming services.

Reception
Upon release, the album received praise from fans and critics alike. The Metal Wanderlust heralded it as a perfect return, saying that "it is simply the best thing the genre has to offer right now." Ending their review by stating that "EVERY fucking song is a ball tearing, arse raping, Thrash fest of the highest order. And it just gets better and better as it goes along." Metal Forces Magazine was more critical and negative of the new release, criticizing its sound as being predictable and generic; Adding they’ve become archetypes and victims of the genre that has once again become crowded with sound-alikes. Though they did speak positive of Kristian "Stan" Havard's guitar work, they ended with "Bury the Pain does not teach us anything new and certainly doesn’t put the pretenders in their place, but Xentrix never had that ability previously anyway. And so as the ten tracks trudge by I can only act on instinct and cast the return of Xentrix to the wayside;Bury the Pain added to my pile of other Xentrix releases that have gathered dust over time."

Track listing

Personnel
Xentrix
Jay Walsh – vocals, guitars
Dennis Gasser – drums
Chris Shires – bass
Kristian "Stan" Havard – guitar

Production
Dan Goldsworthy – artwork, layout
Jaime Gomez Arellano – recording, mixing (track 10)
Andy Sneap – producer, mixing, recording (drums)
Russ Russell – mastering
Martin Talbot – photography
Phil Lokheart – photography
Will Tudor – photography

References

External links

2019 albums
Xentrix albums